A beech–maple forest or a maple beech forest is a climax mesic closed canopy hardwood forest. It is primarily composed of American beech and sugar maple trees which co-dominate the forest and which are the pinnacle of plant succession in their range. A form of this forest was the most common forest type in the Northeastern United States when it was settled by Europeans and remains widespread but scattered today.

Description 
The canopy is dominated by American beech and sugar maple trees, providing little light to the understory. The reduced light provides poor conditions for shrubs, with the exceptions of American witch-hazel and alderleaf viburnum shrubs. The ground cover includes herbs and spring ephemerals, flowers which are able to bloom before the canopy fills in. Seedlings of beech and maple trees are shade-tolerant, allowing them to grow in low light conditions for several years.  These seedling are waiting for an opening in the canopy, and grow rapidly when an opening is made by the death of a mature tree.

Beech–maple forests are often found on flat or rolling terrain, in a variety of moist to well-drained soils with high levels of organic matter. They thrive in glacial till from the Wisconsin glaciation. Typically, in sandy soils, the maple is more common while in soils that have more clay in them, the beech is more dominant. There must be a fairly high level of precipitation.

These forests are the result of ecological succession, a long progression of different plant species over centuries. One possible sere is from bare ground, it would start with weeds, then shrubs, weedy trees (such as mulberry), then coniferous trees (such as juniper) and additional types such as ash lead to a mixed mesophytic forest. Eventually, an oak–hickory forest develops. If the conditions allow, the final climax community for several different series is the beech–maple community. Even in a climax community dominated by two types of trees, there can be many different species of trees on the edges of the forest, in windthrow gaps or in microclimates.

Distribution 

The range of the beech–maple forest type extends from the Atlantic coast west to Minnesota, Michigan and from southern Canada south to Virginia and Tennessee. It is widespread in New York and was an important component of the original vegetation of northeastern Ohio.

Gallery

See also 

Ecological succession
Old-growth forest

References

External links 
 Beech Maple Forest 
 A. B. Williams. The Composition and Dynamics of a Beech-Maple Climax community. First printed in Ecological Monographs Vol 6 No 3, July 1936 pages 318-408.  

Temperate broadleaf and mixed forests in the United States
Ecoregions of the United States
Ecoregions of Canada
Forests of Canada
Temperate broadleaf and mixed forests in Canada
 
Maple
Fagus
Forest ecology